Russell Waters (born 10 June 1908, Glasgow, Lanarkshire – died 19 August 1982, Richmond, Surrey) was a Scottish film actor.

Waters was educated at Hutchesons' Grammar School, Glasgow and the University of Glasgow. He began acting with the Old English Comedy and Shakespeare Company then appeared in repertory theatre, at the Old Vic and in the West End. On screen Waters generally found himself playing mild mannered characters. Waters played the leading man in Richard Massingham's amusing instructional short subjects, among them Tell Me If It Hurts (1936), And So Work (1937), The Daily Round (1947) and What a Life! (1948).

In feature films, Waters played secondary roles such as Craggs in The Blue Lagoon (1949), Mr. West in The Happiest Days of Your Life, Palmer in Chance of a Lifetime and "Wings" Cameron in The Wooden Horse (all three in 1950). In later years, Waters was briefly seen as the Harbour master in The Wicker Man (1973), and his final film role was as Dr. Jones in Ken Loach's Black Jack in 1979.

Among his television appearances was that of an aggrieved butler, Stephens, in a 1965 episode of The Human Jungle (starring Herbert Lom).

Selected filmography

 The Woman in the Hall (1947) - Alfred
 London Belongs to Me (1948) - Clerk of the Court
 Once a Jolly Swagman (1949) - Mr. Pusey
 The Blue Lagoon (1949) - Craggs
 Marry Me! (1949) - Mr. Pearson
 Obsession (1949) - Flying Squad detective
 Dear Mr. Prohack (1949) - Cartwright
 The Happiest Days of Your Life (1950) - Mr. West
 Chance of a Lifetime (1950) - Palmer
 State Secret (1950) - Clubman
 The Wooden Horse (1950) - 'Wings' Cameron
 Seven Days to Noon (1950) - Det. Davis
 The Magnet (1950) - Doctor
 Pool of London (1951) - Sgt. - River Police (uncredited)
 The Browning Version (1951) - School Doorman (uncredited)
 Captain Horatio Hornblower (1951) - Seaman (uncredited)
 Calling Bulldog Drummond (1951) - Ex-service Men Collector (uncredited)
 The Man in the White Suit (1951) - Davidson
 Lady Godiva Rides Again (1951) - Cigar Smoker in Shop (uncredited)
 Green Grow the Rushes (1951) - Joseph Bainbridge (farmer)
 Outcast of the Islands (1951) - 2nd Englishman in Snooker Room (uncredited)
 Mr. Denning Drives North (1951) - Harry Stoper
 Death of an Angel (1952) - Walter Grannage
 Angels One Five (1952) - Airman
 Saturday Island (1952) - Dr. Snyder
 Castle in the Air (1952) - Moffat
 You're Only Young Twice (1952) - (uncredited)
 The Brave Don't Cry (1952) - Hughie Aitken
 Miss Robin Hood (1952) - Bunyan
 The Long Memory (1953) - Scotson (uncredited)
 Time Bomb (1953) - Ticket Collector (uncredited)
 Street Corner (1953) - Det. Constable Brown
 The Cruel Sea (1953) - A.R.P. Warden
 Grand National Night (1953) - Plainclothes Detective
 Turn the Key Softly (1953) - George Jenkins
 The Sword and the Rose (1953) - Sailor
 Rob Roy, the Highland Rogue (1953) - Hugh MacGregor
 Adventure in the Hopfields (1954) - Mr. Quin
 The Maggie (1954) - Hailing Officer
 The Sleeping Tiger (1954) - Manager of Pearce & Mann
 Sherlock Holmes Case of The Pennsylvania Gun - Inspector MacLeod (1954)
 The Young Lovers (1954) - Counterman (uncredited)
 Third Party Risk (1954) - The Scientist
 Lease of Life (1954) - Mr. Russell
 Passing Stranger (1954) - (uncredited)
 Isn't Life Wonderful! (1954) - Green
 The Love Match (1955) - Mr. Postlewaite (uncredited)
 John and Julie (1955) - Garage Policeman
 Now and Forever (1956) - Sgt. Gibson (uncredited)
 Reach for the Sky (1956) - Pearson (uncredited)
 It's Great to Be Young (1956) - Mr. Scott, School Inspector
 The Man in the Sky (1957) - Sim
 Interpol (1957) - Company man
 Let's Be Happy (1957) - Hotel Reception Clerk
 The Key (1958) - Sparks
 A Night to Remember (1958) - Chief Clerk - Victualling Department (uncredited)
 Next to No Time (1958) - Clerk
 Left Right and Centre (1959) - Mr. Bray
 Yesterday's Enemy (1959) - Brigadier
 The Bridal Path (1959) - Bank Cashier
 Danger Tomorrow (1960) - Steve
 The Day They Robbed the Bank of England (1960) - Strand receptionist (uncredited)
 Man in the Moon (1960) - Woomera director
 Bomb in the High Street (1961) - Trent
 Flat Two (1962) - Clerk of the Court
 Play It Cool (1962) - Euston Porter #1 (uncredited)
 Reach for Glory (1962) - Mr. Freeman
 The War Lover (1962) - Pub Landlord (uncredited)
 The Amorous Prawn (1962) - McLeod (uncredited)
 The Flood (1963)
 I Could Go On Singing (1963) - Reynolds
 The Punch and Judy Man (1963) - Bobby Bachelor
 Heavens Above! (1963) - Bit Part, Cabinet Office (uncredited)
 80,000 Suspects (1963) - Town Clerk of Bath (uncredited)
 Crooks in Cloisters (1964) - Ship's Chandler
 The Heroes of Telemark (1965) - Sr. Sandersen
 The Trygon Factor (1966) - Sgt. Chivers
 The Devil Rides Out (1968) - Malin
 Twisted Nerve (1968) - Hospital Attendant (uncredited)
 Kidnapped (1971) - Advocates Secretary
 The Wicker Man (1973) - Harbour Master
 Black Jack (1979) - Dr. Jones

References

External links
 

1908 births
1982 deaths
Scottish male stage actors
Scottish male film actors
Scottish male television actors
Alumni of the University of Glasgow
People educated at Hutchesons' Grammar School
20th-century Scottish male actors
Actors from Glasgow